There have been two battles at Kortrijk, a Flemish town in Belgium, called Courtrai in French :

 Battle of the Golden Spurs
 Battle of Kortrijk (1794)
 Battle of Courtrai (disambiguation)